Cornularia elegans is a species of fungi in the family Dermateaceae. It is found in Italy.

References

External links 
 Cornularia elegans at catalogueoflife.org
 Cornularia elegans at MycoBank

Dermateaceae
Fungi described in 1927